Collinsia concolor is a species of flowering plant in the plantain family known by the common name Chinese houses.

It is native to Southern California and Baja California. It grows in the woodlands and chaparral of the coastal mountain ranges, such as the Peninsular Ranges.

Description
Collinsia concolor is an annual herb producing an erect stem up to about 45 centimeters tall. The leaves are oppositely arranged, each widely linear in shape, flat, and sometimes slightly toothed.

The hairy gland-covered inflorescence is an interrupted series of dense whorls of flowers. Each flower is 1 to 1.5 centimeters long, with a hairy base and a corolla divided into two upper lobes and three lower. The flower is blue to purple with a neatly purple-dotted white area on the upper lobes. The middle of the three lower lobes has a hairy tip.

External links
Jepson Manual Treatment of Collinsia concolor
USDA Plants Profile
Collinsia concolor — U.C. Photo gallery

concolor
Flora of Baja California
Flora of California
Natural history of the California chaparral and woodlands
Natural history of the Peninsular Ranges
Natural history of the Transverse Ranges
Plants described in 1895
Flora without expected TNC conservation status